Michael Elliot Epps (born November 18, 1970) is an American stand-up comedian and actor. He played Day-Day Jones in Next Friday and its sequel, Friday After Next, and also appeared in The Hangover and The Hangover Part III as "Black Doug". He was the voice of main character Boog in Open Season 2, replacing Martin Lawrence, with whom he starred in the comedy Welcome Home Roscoe Jenkins, playing "Reggie", cousin of Roscoe (played by Lawrence). He played Lloyd Jefferson "L.J." Wade in the films Resident Evil: Apocalypse (2004) and Resident Evil: Extinction (2007). He has had starring roles in the sitcoms Uncle Buck and The Upshaws.

Early life 
Epps was born and raised in Indianapolis, Indiana, the son of Mary Reed and (the late) Tommie Epps. In his adulthood, Epps moved to Brooklyn to star in Def Comedy Jam in 1994.

Career

Stand-up comedy 
Epps began his professional career by joining the Def Comedy Jam tour in 1995 and starred in two of HBO's Def Comedy Jam broadcasts.

Acting 
Epps' first on-screen appearance came in Vin Diesel's second directorial film, Strays in 1997. In 1999, Epps was then cast as Ice Cube's co-star in the sequel, Next Friday. This followed weeks of auditions, after Ice Cube attended a stand-up set Epps did, and then asked Epps to try out for the role of Day-Day Jones.
Later that year, Epps had a cameo in 3 Strikes, and supported Jamie Foxx in Bait.

Epps had a voice role in the 2001 film Dr. Dolittle 2 as Sonny the Bear and finished the year with a featured role as comical pimp Baby Powder in How High, starring Method Man and Redman. Epps reunited with Ice Cube in 2002 as the bumbling thief to Ice Cube's bounty hunter in All About the Benjamins, and again re-teamed with Cube in Friday's second sequel Friday After Next. Epps also voiced another bear character (Boog) in the 2008 film Open Season 2 after Martin Lawrence declined the role. In 2010, Epps also released a stand-up comedy special, Under Rated & Never Faded, and hosted the 2010 BET Hip Hop Awards.

Epps starred alongside Jordin Sparks and Whitney Houston in the 2012 remake of Sparkle, in his first non-comedic role as the main antagonist, Satin, a stand-up comic by day, an evil and abusive drug kingpin by night, who is engaged in an affair with the titular character's sister. Epps' performance was well received by critics and audiences. In 2014, Epps landed the coveted role of Richard Pryor in a planned Pryor biopic to be directed by Lee Daniels; however, the project has remained in development hell. Epps did portray Pryor in the 2016 Nina Simone biopic Nina, and is set to play him again in a planned HBO drama series about the L.A. Lakers.

Epps had a starring role in the 2016 comedy horror film Meet the Blacks and its 2021 sequel The House Next Door: Meet the Blacks 2. He also starred as the title character in the single-season 2016 sitcom Uncle Buck. Since 2021, he has been a main cast member on the Netflix sitcom The Upshaws.

Music 
Epps "hosted" the Jim Jones and Skull Gang album Jim Jones & Skull Gang Present A Tribute To Bad Santa Starring Mike Epps. Epps has also made a song called "Trying to Be a Gangsta" with Pooh Bear.

Epps also hosted G Unit's 2008 mixtape Elephant In The Sand, appearing on the track "Hollow Thru Him". Epps also has a song called "Big Girls", which came out in 2008. It was originally recorded by Bow Wow featuring Yung Joc. The song is currently on iTunes and can be found on his album, Funny Bidness: Da Album, which was released October 27, 2009. Epps also has featured in rapper French Montana's Mac Wit Da Cheese mixtape, which was released on April 19, 2009. Epps has also featured on the Dom Kennedy song "Intro/Hard Work" on his FutureStreet/DrugSounds mixtape.

Part of his stand-up comedy in Under Rated & Never Faded was sampled for the song "I'm On Everything" by Bad Meets Evil on their first EP, Hell: The Sequel and on the track "Runaway", from J. Cole's second album Born Sinner. Mike Epps was also known in his hometown of Indianapolis as the CEO of Naptown Records. In 2006 he signed local artist Philthyphil. This artist had just been released from prison after serving three years for a drug indictment in which he was the suspected distributor of large amounts of narcotics. The record deal which was reportedly worth $175,000 was later terminated after Phillip "Philthyphil" White was charged with first-degree murder in Oakland, CA in 2007.

Epps has made cameo appearances in many music videos, mostly by hip hop artists, including "Gangsta Nation" (2003) by Westside Connection, "A Bay Bay" (2007) by Hurricane Chris, "No Effort" (2017) by Tee Grizzley, and "Bank Account" (2017) by 21 Savage.

Super Bowl XLVI 
Epps served as the "Super Bowl ambassador" in his native Indianapolis for the 2012 Super Bowl. He was featured in commercials promoting the Super Bowl Village and he made special appearances in the Village during the week of the Super Bowl.

Controversies
Epps has been criticized by disability campaigners for mocking physically and mentally disabled children in his stand-up act.

On June 1, 2014, Epps purportedly assaulted fellow stand-up comedian LaVar Walker outside of the Uptown Comedy Club. It was stated Epps and two of his bodyguards did this in response to Walker making a parody video about Epps and comedian Kevin Hart. Epps allegedly struck him in the face and kicked him in the stomach and back, while one of the other two men threw the victim's cellphone and crushed his prescription glasses. Atlanta Police issued a warrant for Epps' arrest two days later on June 3.

Around mid-2017, Epps received criticism for bringing a kangaroo onto the stage during one of his shows. Many noted the animal looked distressed, with Epps grabbing and holding it against its will. Epps later apologized, saying it was completely unscripted and that he would never hurt an animal.

Personal life 
Epps married OWN Network executive and Iyanla: Fix My Life producer Kyra Robinson, in Newport Beach, California, in June 2019. He was previously married to Mechelle McCain, whom he married in July 2006. The pair lived in Beverly Hills, California together until they divorced in September 2017.

In a 2019 GQ interview, Epps denied the long-standing rumor that he is related to fellow actor Omar Epps, saying, "Are Mike Epps and Omar Epps related? No, I think we got the same master, though."

Filmography

Film

Television

Documentary

Comedy Specials

Music videos
 "Whatchulookinat" – Whitney Houston
 "Ay Bay Bay" – Hurricane Chris
 "Gangsta Nation" – Westside Connection
 "Why We Thugs" – Ice Cube
 "What You Know" – T.I.
 "ASAP" – T.I.
 "Never Forget" – Napoleon
 "I'm Lit" – Square Off
 "I Don't Know Y'all" – Young Dro
 "Mrs. Right" – Mindless Behavior featuring Diggy Simmons
 "Nothin'" – NORE
 "I'm on Everything" – Bad Meets Evil
 "How Come You Don't Call Me" – Alicia Keys
 "Bitch, Don't Kill My Vibe" – Kendrick Lamar
 "I Was Your Baby"- Angie Stone
 "No Flex Zone!" – Rae Sremmurd
 "Ayo" – Chris Brown and Tyga
 "No Effort" – Tee Grizzley
 "Bank Account" – 21 Savage
 "Let Bygones Be Bygones" – Snoop Dogg
 "Baby" – Angie Stone ft. Betty Wright

Discography 
 Studio albums
 Funny Bidness: Da Album (2009)

 Collaboration albums
 A Tribute to Bad Santa Starring Mike Epps (with Jim Jones & Skull Gang) (2008)
 Omar Ray Life & Timez of Suge Gotti, Vol. 1 (2012)

 Guest Appearances
 2009: "I'm a Go and Get My..." with (Busta Rhymes) on Back on My B.S.
 2011: “I’m on Everything” with (Bad Meets Evil) on Hell: The Sequel
 2016: "2011 BET Cypha" with (Termanology, French Montana, Wais P, Rico Staxx, & Cross) on Cameo King III

 Singles
 "Big Girls" (2008)
 "Trying to Be a Gangsta" (2009)
 "Aint Chu You?" (2009)

References

External links 

 
 

Living people
Midwest hip hop musicians
African-American film producers
American male film actors
20th-century African-American writers
American stand-up comedians
American male voice actors
Rappers from Indiana
Male actors from Indianapolis
African-American male actors
American male television actors
20th-century American comedians
21st-century American comedians
Film producers from Indiana
African-American male comedians
American male comedians
20th-century American rappers
21st-century American rappers
African-American male rappers
20th-century American male musicians
21st-century American male musicians
People from Roosevelt Island
1970 births
20th-century African-American politicians
African-American men in politics
20th-century American politicians
21st-century African-American musicians